Sir David Austin Trippier, RD, DL (born 15 May 1946) is a British Conservative Party politician and author.

Early life
Trippier was born on 15 May 1946. He was educated at Bury Grammar School.

Political career
Trippier fought Rochdale in a by election in 1972, coming third. In the elections in February and October 1974, he stood at Oldham West, but was beaten each time by future Labour Cabinet Minister, Michael Meacher.

He was the Member of Parliament (MP) for Rossendale from 1979 to 1983, and for Rossendale and Darwen from 1983, until he lost his seat in 1992, by 120 votes to Labour's Janet Anderson. Trippier was appointed his PPS by Kenneth Clarke while he was Minister of State for Health at the Department of Health and Social Security from 1982 to 1983.

He then served as Parliamentary Under-Secretary of State for Trade and Industry, 1983 to 1985, Parliamentary Under-Secretary of State for Employment, 1985 to 1987, Parliamentary Under-Secretary of State for the Environment, 1987 to 1989, and then Minister of State for the Environment and Countryside at the Department of the Environment from 1989 to 1992.

Later life
He was knighted after he lost his seat in the House of Commons, and appointed High Sheriff of Lancashire for 1997. He subsequently became the Deputy Chairman of the Conservative Party's Northern Board. He married barrister Ruth Worthington in 1975.

Freemasonry
He was initiated in to Freemasonry in 1968, at the age of 21. In 2011, he became the Provincial Grand Master for the Masonic Province of East Lancashire. He was invested on 22 February 2012. He retired as Provincial Grand Master on 18 November 2021.

References

The Times Guide to the House of Commons, Times Newspapers Ltd, 1992
Lend Me Your Ears 9781841041780  published by The Memoir Club

External links 
 

1945 births
Living people
Conservative Party (UK) MPs for English constituencies
People educated at Bury Grammar School
UK MPs 1979–1983
UK MPs 1983–1987
UK MPs 1987–1992
Politics of Blackburn with Darwen
Deputy Lieutenants of Lancashire
High Sheriffs of Lancashire
Knights Bachelor
Freemasons of the United Grand Lodge of England